Aricoceras is an extinct genus of the Adrianitidae family. They are an extinct group of ammonoid, which are shelled cephalopods related to squids, belemnites, octopuses, and cuttlefish, and more distantly to the nautiloids.

References

 The Paleobiology Database accessed on 10/01/07

Adrianitidae
Goniatitida genera
Permian ammonites
Prehistoric animals of Asia
Paleozoic life of British Columbia